Simon Alcott is a retired Rugby Union player who finished his career at Exeter Chiefs. He made his debut for Exeter on 30 August 2008 against Esher. His position of choice is Hooker.

Exeter Chiefs announced on 11 April 2013 that Alcott will be retiring from rugby with immediate effect due to a neck injury.

References

External links
 Exeter Player Profile
 Alcott Remains As A Chief

1983 births
Living people
English rugby union players
Exeter Chiefs players
Rugby union players from Cuckfield
Rugby union hookers